Batumi Black Sea Music and Art Festival is an international festival that takes place in Batumi, Georgia every year.

The festival was founded in 2013 by Georgian pianist, and UNESCO Artist for Peace Elisso Bolkvadze. Since then, the Elisso Bolkvadze Charity Foundation "Lira" has been the event organizer. One of the project's main focuses is the promotion of young Georgian talents.

Musicians from all regions of Georgia take part in the festival. The outstanding among them are invited to participate in international programs and concerts abroad.

Along with Georgian musicians, famous foreign musicians regularly participate in the festival.

The Batumi Black Sea Music and Art Festival is the only cultural event in Georgia that has received the high patronage of UNESCO five times.

On July 23–31, 2022, the Batumi Black Sea International Music and Art Festival was held for the ninth time. On July 23, the festival opened with a charity gala concert, and the proceeds were used for Ukrainian children affected by the war waged by Russia in Ukraine.

At the invitation of the project's founder, Elisso Bolkvadze, the Wikimedia Community User Group Georgia also participated in the 2022 festival. Members of the group introduced Wikipedia's essence, purpose, principles, and plans to the public.

References

External links
Official website
Creative Cities Network — Batumi en.unesco.org
WELCOME SPEECH OF ELISO BOLKVADZE AT BATUMI BLACK SEA MUSIC AND ART FESTIVAL

Music festivals in Georgia (country)
Culture in Batumi
Tourist attractions in Adjara
Music festivals established in 2013
Summer events in Georgia (country)